Charles Pfeiffer Alm (born March 27, 1937) is an American rower who competed at the 1960 Summer Olympics in Rome, Italy. He was born in Seattle, Washington. In 1960 he was a crew member of the American boat in the coxed fours events.

References 

1937 births
Living people
American male rowers
Olympic rowers of the United States
Rowers at the 1960 Summer Olympics
Rowers from Seattle